The transverse field Ising model is a quantum version of the classical Ising model. It features a lattice with nearest neighbour interactions determined by the alignment or anti-alignment of spin projections along the  axis, as well as an external magnetic field perpendicular to the  axis (without loss of generality, along the  axis) which creates an energetic bias for one x-axis spin direction over the other.

An important feature of this setup is that, in a quantum sense, the spin projection along the  axis and the spin projection along the  axis are not commuting observable quantities. That is, they cannot both be observed simultaneously. This means classical statistical mechanics cannot describe this model, and a quantum treatment is needed.

Specifically, the model has the following quantum Hamiltonian:

Phases of the 1D transverse field Ising model

Below the discussion is restricted to the one dimensional case where each lattice site is a two-dimensional complex Hilbert space (i.e. it represents a spin 1/2 particle). The Hamiltonian possesses a  symmetry group, as it is invariant under the unitary operation of flipping all of the spins in the  direction. More precisely, the symmetry transformation is given by the unitary .

The 1D model admits two phases, depending on whether the ground state (specifically, in the case of degeneracy, a ground state which is not a macroscopically-entangled state) breaks or preserves the aforementioned  spin-flip symmetry.

The model can be exactly solved for all coupling constants. However, in terms of on-site spins the solution is generally very inconvenient to write down explicitly in terms of the spin variables. It is more convenient to write the solution explicitly in terms of fermionic variables defined by Jordan-Wigner transformation, in which case the excited states have a simple quasiparticle or quasihole description.

Ordered phase

When , the system is said to be in the ordered phase. In this phase the ground state breaks the spin-flip symmetry. Thus, the ground state is in fact two-fold degenerate. For  this phase exhibits ferromagnetic ordering, while for  antiferromagnetic ordering exists.

Precisely, if  is a ground state of the Hamiltonian, then  is also a ground state, and together  and  span the degenerate ground state space.

This is a gapped phase, meaning that the lowest energy excited state(s) have an energy higher than the ground state energy by a nonzero amount (nonvanishing in the thermodynamic limit).

Disordered phase
In contrast, when , the system is said to be in the disordered phase. The ground state preserves the spin-flip symmetry, and is nondegenerate.

This is also a gapped phase. The energy gap is

Gapless phase

When , the system undergoes a quantum phase transition. This conformal theory has central charge , and is the simplest of the unitary minimal models with central charge less than 1. Besides the identity operator, the theory has two primary fields, one with scaling dimensions  and another one with scaling dimensions .

Jordan-Wigner transformation 
It is possible to rewrite the spin variables as fermionic variables, using a highly nonlocal transformation known as the Jordan-Wigner Transformation.

Then the transverse field Ising Hamiltonian (assuming an infinite chain and ignoring boundary effects) can be expressed entirely as a sum of local quadratic terms containing creation and annihilation operators. This Hamiltonian fails to conserve total fermion number and does not have the associated  global continuous symmetry, due to the presence of the  term. However, it does conserve fermion parity. That is, the Hamiltonian commutes with the quantum operator that indicates whether the total number of fermions is even or odd, and this parity does not change under time evolution of the system. The Hamiltonian is mathematically identical to that of a superconductor in the mean field Bogoliubov-de Gennes formalism and can be completely understood in the same standard way. The exact excitation spectrum and eigenvalues can be determined by Fourier transforming into momentum space and diagonalising the Hamiltonian.

Kramers-Wannier duality 
A nonlocal mapping of Pauli matrices known as the Kramers–Wannier duality transformation can be done as follows:

Then, in terms of the newly-defined Pauli matrices with tildes, which obey the same algebraic relations as the original Pauli matrices, the Hamiltonian is simply . This indicates that the model with coupling parameter  is dual to the model with coupling parameter , and establishes a duality between the ordered phase and the disordered phase. In terms of the Majorana fermions mentioned above, this duality is more obviously manifested in the trivial relabeling .

Note that there are some subtle considerations at the boundaries of the Ising chain; as a result of these, the degeneracy and  symmetry properties of the ordered and disordered phases are changed under the Kramers-Wannier duality.

Generalisations 
The q-state quantum Potts model and the  quantum clock model are generalisations of the transverse field Ising model to lattice systems with  states per site. The transverse field Ising model represents the case where  .

Classical Ising Model 
The quantum transverse field Ising model in  dimensions is dual to an anisotropic classical Ising model in  dimensions.

References

Lattice models
Spin models
Quantum models